The Miles M.5 Sparrowhawk was a 1930s British single-seat racing and touring monoplane designed by Miles Aircraft Limited.

Design and development
The prototype M.5 Sparrowhawk was developed from standard Miles Hawk components as an entry into the King's Cup Race of 1935 piloted by F.G. Miles. The standard Hawk fuselage was shortened and accommodation was for only one pilot, sitting as low as possible. The top decking was reduced in height, a special high-compression version of the de Havilland Gipsy Six engine was fitted, and the undercarriage track was widened.

A further five Sparrowhawks (designated M.5A) were also built as King's Cup Racers and three were delivered to customers but they did not perform spectacularly. In 1936 Victor Smith entered Sparrowhawk G-AELT into the Schlesinger Race from Portsmouth to Johannesburg but had problems with oil after Salonika and eventually retired in Khartoum. The final two M.5A Sparrowhawks were built in 1936 but were not flown until 1940. One was modified and flown to meet a requirement for an experimental aircraft for high-lift flap research with the Royal Aircraft Establishment, it was later de-modified and used as a communications aircraft. The sixth Sparrowhawk was modified with short span wings and wide chord flaps for experimental work.

The prototype, registered G-ADNL, was modified in late 1953 as a jet-powered racer for Fred Dunkerley. The front fuselage and tail unit were modified and it was re-designated the M.77 Sparrowjet.

Operational history
The prototype Sparrowhawk survived the Second World War and was flown by Fairey Aviation test pilot C.G.M. Alington in several UK air races until 1950. It was then sold back to Miles and was modified into the M.77 Sparrowjet.

The third Sparrowhawk was sold to South Africa in October 1937 as ZS-ANO. It was fitted with a cabin top and was impressed into service with the South African Air Force in 1940.

Variants
M.5
Prototype single-seat racer with a 147 hp de Havilland Gipsy Major engine, two built
M.5A
Production version with a 130 hp de Havilland Gipsy Major I engine, three built
M.77 Sparrowjet
M.5 prototype modified as a jet racer, powered by two Turbomeca Palas jet engines

Operators
Civil aircraft were flown in South Africa, United Kingdom and the United States and the following military operators:

South African Air Force 

Royal Aircraft Establishment

Specifications (M.5)

See also

References

Notes

Bibliography

 Brown, Don Lambert. Miles Aircraft Since 1925. London: Putnam & Company Ltd., 1970. . 
 The Illustrated Encyclopedia of Aircraft (Part Work 1982-1985). Orbis Publishing.
 Jackson, A.J. British Civil Aircraft since 1919. London: Putnam, 1974. .
 Jackson, A.J. British Civil Aircraft since 1919, Volume 3. London: Putnam, 1988. .

1930s British sport aircraft
Sparrowhawk
Single-engined tractor aircraft
Aircraft first flown in 1935